Mack Robinson is the name of:

 Mack Robinson (athlete) (1914–2000), American sprinter
 J. Mack Robinson (1923–2014), Georgia businessman